Voloshchenko is a Ukrainian surname. Notable people with the surname include:

 Andriy Voloshchenko (1883-1983)
 Mariya Voloshchenko (born 1989), Ukrainian diver

Ukrainian-language surnames